As-Sabaq Mosque , was a mosque located in Medina, Saudi Arabia, and it was located north-west of Al-Masjid an-Nabawi, near the  SAPTCO (Saudi Public Transport Company) station. The place was originally a place for horse racing during the time of the Islamic prophet Muhammad.

Reference in Hadith 
There is an account in Hadith Al-Bukhari from the isnad of 'Abdullah bin Muhammad,  Mu'awiyah,  Abu Ishaq dari Musa bin 'Uqbah dari Nafi' and Ibnu Umar, that the prophet participating in a horse racing from Al-Hayfa to Tsaniyatul Wada' around six or seven miles, and from Tsaniyatul Wada' to the Bani Zuraiq Mosque for around one mile. Ibu Umar also participated in the race.

See also

 List of mosques in Saudi Arabia
  Lists of mosques  
 List of mosques in Medina

References 

Mosques in Medina